Pedicularis groenlandica is a showy flowering plant in the family Orobanchaceae which is known by the common names elephant's head, elephant-head lousewort and butterfly tongue.

Its sharply-toothed fernlike leaves are located low on the stout stem. The stem is topped with a large inflorescence of bright pink to purple or white flowers. Each flower has a long, pointed beak which curves upward, superficially resembling the trunk of an elephant, and the lateral lobes of the flower resemble an elephant's ears. Flowers bloom June to August.

Like other louseworts and related broomrape genera, this is a root hemiparasite which obtains nutrients from the roots of other plants by piercing them with haustoria.

Habitat and distribtution 
This plant is found in the high mountain ranges of western North America, including the Cascades, High Sierra, Rocky Mountains, much of Canada, and Greenland. In Greenland however, it is only found a in a single valley southest of Nuuk.

It grows in moist mountain meadows.

References

External links
 Calflora Database: Pedicularis groenlandica (Elephant head lousewort)
Jepson Manual  eFlora treatment of Pedicularis groenlandica
USDA Plants Profile for Pedicularis groenlandica (elephanthead lousewort)
UC CalPhotos gallery of Pedicularis groenlandica

groenlandica
Flora of Greenland
Flora of Canada
Flora of the Western United States
Flora of Alaska
Flora of California
Flora of the Cascade Range
Flora of the Rocky Mountains
Flora of the Sierra Nevada (United States)
Taxa named by Anders Jahan Retzius
Flora without expected TNC conservation status